Limpopo Tourism and Parks Board is a governmental organisation established in 2001 and  responsible for maintaining wilderness areas and public nature reserves in Limpopo Province, South Africa.

Parks Managed by Limpopo Tourism and Parks Board 
 Lekgalameetse Provincial Park
 Letaba Ranch Provincial Park
 Mano'mbe Provincial Park
 Mokolo Dam Provincial Park
 Nwanedi Provincial Park
 Tzaneen Dam Provincial Park

See also 
 South African National Parks
 Protected areas of South Africa

References

External links 
 Limpopo Tourism and Parks Board
Game & Nature Reserves in Soutpansberg, Limpopo

Tourism agencies
 
Tourism in South Africa